Günter Mack (12 December 1930 – 27 March 2007) was a German actor. He appeared in more than ninety films from 1963 to 2007. Günter Mack died of cancer at the age of 76. Already in 1996 his wife Wiltrud, mother of his daughter Susanne, had died. Next to her, he was buried in the municipal cemetery of Gröbenzell (section 41). After divorcing fellow actress Ulrike Luderer, he lived with Renate von Hagemeister until his death.

Selected filmography

References

External links 

1930 births
2007 deaths
German male film actors